Syed Iftikhar Ali Bokhari (6 July 1935 – 10 November 2021), also known as I. A. Bokhari, was a Pakistani politician and cricketer. He was a member of the Senate of Pakistan between March 1988 and March 1991. He played 19 matches of first-class cricket between 1952 and 1966.

Early life and education
Bokhari was born on 6 July 1935 in Lahore, British India, to the Syed family of Jhang. He received his early education from Aitchison College. He received his bachelor's and master's degrees from the University of Cambridge.

Political career
He was elected to the Senate of Pakistan in 1985. He served between March 1988 and March 1991.

Cricket career
Bokhari made his first-class debut in 1951–52 at the age of 16, opening the batting for the Punjab Governor's XI against Punjab University. As "I.A. Bokhari", he spent a year at King's School, Ely, where he scored 453 runs and took 19 wickets in 1953. He went up to Cambridge University later that year. He appeared in the freshmen's match in 1954 alongside his compatriot Shaharyar Khan, but neither was selected for the university team. He played for Cambridgeshire in the Minor Counties Championship in 1956, scoring 649 runs in seven matches at an average of 72.11, and won the competition's batting award. He eventually played one match for Cambridge University, the first match of 1957, but without success.

Returning to Pakistan, Bokhari played two matches as an opening batsman for Punjab in the Quaid-e-Azam Trophy in 1957–58, and two for Lahore in 1958–59, with a top score of 27. He was in outstanding form for Lahore in the inaugural season of the Ayub Trophy in 1960–61. In the first match he became the first player to score a double century in the Ayub Trophy when he scored 203 not out against Punjab University; in the semi-final he made 0 and 100 not out against Rawalpindi and Peshawar; in the final he made 50 (Lahore's top score) and 4 not out, to finish the competition as the leading batsman with 357 runs at 178.50.

Bokhari scored his last first-class century in the first match of the 1961–62 season, when he made 106 against Multan. He played one match for Sargodha, captaining them in the Ayub Trophy in 1964–65, when he top-scored in both innings in a low-scoring match with 17 and 45 against Combined Services.

References

External links
 Iftikhar Bokhari at CricketArchive
 Iftikhar Bokhari at Cricinfo

1935 births
2021 deaths
Members of the Senate of Pakistan
Pakistani cricketers
Cricketers from Lahore
Aitchison College alumni
People educated at King's Ely
Alumni of the University of Cambridge
Cambridge University cricketers
Sargodha cricketers
Punjab (Pakistan) cricketers
Lahore cricketers
Cambridgeshire cricketers
Politicians from Lahore
Pakistani sportsperson-politicians